The 1938 Santa Barbara State Gauchos football team represented Santa Barbara State as an independent during the 1938 college football season. The following year, the Gauchos and San Diego State join Fresno State and San Jose State as charter members of the California Collegiate Athletic Association (CCAA).

The Gauchos were led by fifth-year head coach Theodore "Spud" Harder and played home games at La Playa Stadium in Santa Barbara, California. They finished the season with a record of two wins and eight losses (2–8, 0–3 SCIAC). Overall, the team was outscored by its opponents 47–109 for the season. That included the Gauchos being shut out in six of the ten games.

Schedule

Team players in the NFL
The following Santa Barbara Gaucho players were selected in the 1939 NFL Draft.

Notes

References

Santa Barbara State
UC Santa Barbara Gauchos football seasons
Santa Barbara State Gauchos football